The 2002 Black Reel Awards, which annually recognize and celebrate the achievements of black people in feature, independent and television films, took place in Washington, D.C. on April 21, 2002. Training Day was the big winner of the evening, taking home four awards, followed by Ali with three awards.

Winners and nominees
Winners are listed first and highlighted in bold.

References

2002 in American cinema
2002 awards in the United States
Black Reel Awards
2001 film awards